Bernard Hall may refer to:

 Bernard Hall (footballer) (born 1942), English footballer
 Bernard Hall (American football) (born 1967), American football player
 Lindsay Bernard Hall (1859–1935), Australian artist